The 2021 Women's State of Origin was the fourth official Women's State of Origin rugby league match between the New South Wales and Queensland. It was played at Sunshine Coast Stadium on 25 June 2021. The teams have played each other annually since 1999 with the 2021 game being the fourth played under the State of Origin banner.

Background
On 5 May 2021, it was announced that Sunshine Coast Stadium would host Women's State of Origin for the second consecutive year. The curtain-raiser for the senior Women's Origin game was the under-19 Origin between Queensland and New South Wales.

The match is historically notable for being the first Women's State of Origin fixture where the players, coaches and on-field officials were all women.

Teams

Match summary

Under-19s
The Under-19 Women's State of Origin was played as a curtain-raiser to the senior Women's State of Origin match.

Teams

Match summary

References 

2021 in Australian rugby league
2021 in women's rugby league
2021 in Australian women's sport
Rugby League State of Origin
Women's rugby league competitions in Australia
Rugby league in Queensland
Sport in the Sunshine Coast, Queensland